The following are the winners of the 40th annual (2013) Origins Award, presented at Origins 2014:

External links
 2013 Origins Awards Winners
 ICv2 - Origins Awards Winners

2013 awards